Catch and release is a form of recreational fishing. Catch and release may also refer to:

Catch & Release (album), album by Matt Simons
"Catch & Release" (song), song by Matt Simons
Catch and Release (2006 film), a 2006 romantic comedy film by Susannah Grant
Catch and Release (2018 film), a 2018 drama film by Dominique Cardona and Laurie Colbert
"Catch and Release" (Homeland), an episode of Homeland
"Catch and Release" (Steven Universe), an episode of Steven Universe
Catch and release, a practice in patent law
Catch and release (immigration), a practice in United States immigration enforcement
Trap–neuter–return, a strategy for controlling feral animal populations

See also
Capture and release (disambiguation)